Johannes Aloysius Antonius Engelman (born Utrecht, 7 June 1900; died Amsterdam, 20 March 1972) was a Dutch writer.  He was the recipient of the Constantijn Huygens Prize in 1954. Dutch composers like Marius Monnikendam and Marjo Tal set several of his works to  music.

Works
 1927 - Het roosvenster
 1930 - Sine nomine
 1931 - Parnassus en Empyreum
 1932 - Torso
 1932 - Tuin van Eros 
 1934 - Tuin van Eros en andere gedichten
 1936 - Tympanon
 1937 - Bij de bron
 1937 - Het bezegeld hart
 1942 - Noodweer
 1945 - Vrijheid
 1950 - Philomela
 1955 - Koning Oedipus
 1955 - Twee maal Apollo
 1960 - Verzamelde gedichten
 1969 - Het Bittermeer en andere gedichten

References

 Engelman, Johannes Aloysius Antonius (1900-1972), Biografisch Woordenboek van Nederland

1900 births
1972 deaths
20th-century Dutch novelists
20th-century Dutch male writers
Writers from Utrecht (city)
Constantijn Huygens Prize winners
Dutch male novelists